Alexander or Alex Wilson may refer to:

Literature
 Alexander Wilson (English writer) (1893–1963), MI6 officer and writer of a series of spy novels
 L. Alex Wilson (1909–1960), African-American journalist
 Alexander Wilson (Canadian writer) (1953–1993), American-born Canadian writer, landscape designer, and community activist

Military
 Alexander Wilson (Royal Navy officer) (1760–1834), Royal Navy rear-admiral
 Sir Alexander Wilson (British Army officer) (1858–1937), British Army major-general and Lieutenant-Governor of Jersey
 Sir James Wilson (British Army officer) (Alexander James Wilson, 1921–2004), British Army lieutenant-general

Politics
 Alexander Wilson (Virginia politician), United States Representative from Virginia, 1803–1809
 Alexander Wilson (Wisconsin politician) (1833–1888), attorney general of Wisconsin, 1878–1882
 Alexander Wilson (New South Wales politician) (1849–1927), member of the New South Wales Legislative Assembly
 Alexander Wilson (Australian politician) (1889–1954), Member of the Australian House of Representatives
 Alexander Wilson (Scottish politician) (1917–1978), Labour Member of Parliament for Hamilton
 Alex Wilson (Australian politician) (1920–2004), member of the Queensland Legislative Assembly

Sports
 Alexander Wilson (cricketer) (1840–1911), New Zealand cricketer
 Alex Wilson (rugby union) (1874–1932), New Zealand rugby union player
 Alex Wilson (Canadian sprinter) (1907–1994)
 Alex Wilson (footballer, born 1908) (1908–1971), Scottish football goalkeeper
 Alex Wilson (footballer, born 1933) (1933–2010), Scottish football defender
 Alex Wilson (skier) (born 1974), American skier
 Alex Wilson (baseball) (born 1986), baseball pitcher
 Alex Wilson (Swiss sprinter) (born 1990)
 Alex Wilson (basketball) (born 1994), Australian basketball player

Other people
 Alexander Wilson (astronomer) (1714–1786), Scottish type-maker, meteorologist and astronomer
 Alexander Wilson (ornithologist) (1766–1813), Scottish-American poet and ornithologist
 Alexander Stoddart Wilson (1854–1909), Scottish minister and botanist
 Alexander Wilson (photographer) (died 1922), Scottish amateur photographer of Dundee
 Alexander Brown Wilson (1857–1938), Australian architect based in Queensland
 Alexander Wilson (British architect) (1888–1969), English architect based in Nottingham
 Alex Wilson (musician) (born 1971), English salsa and Latin jazz pianist

See also
 Alexandra Wilson (born 1968), American actress
 Alexandra Wilkis Wilson, American entrepreneur
 Al Wilson (disambiguation)
 Sandy Wilson (disambiguation)